Captain America: The First Avenger—Original Motion Picture Soundtrack is the soundtrack album to the Marvel Studios film of the same name, based on the character created by Marvel Comics. The music was composed by Alan Silvestri and recorded by the Air Studios. Buena Vista Records announced the details for the soundtrack in June 2011 and released it on July 19 in the United States.

Track listing 

Note: "Captain America March" was only released as a download bonus track and is not included on the physical CD. A 1940s style big band rendition of "Make Way for Tomorrow Today" from Iron Man 2 was arranged by Alan Silvestri, befitting the time period, is heard in the film, but is not included in the soundtrack, and would later be used in the ending credits of Avengers: Endgame.

Production 
In June 2011, Buena Vista Records announced the details for the soundtrack release of Captain America: The First Avenger. The album includes the original score by Alan Silvestri, as well as the original song "Star Spangled Man" with music by Alan Menken and lyrics by David Zippel. The soundtrack was recorded at Air Studios in London and was released on July 19, 2011.

Reception 

The score received a positive response from critics. James Southall of Movie-Wave.net commented, "for those of us tearing our hair out in despair at the ludicrously dumb approach to scoring [Marvel's] films since Iron Man, we might be able to hold off on needing hair implants for a little while longer – this is precisely the old-school symphonic score with a big theme that we’ve been waiting for."

Jonathan Broxton of Movie Music UK stated, "Captain America is one of the most enjoyable scores of the summer for one single reason – it’s fun. There’s nothing pretentious about it, nothing hidden, no deeper meanings. Much like the film it accompanies it wears its heart on its sleeve and has a simple intent: to excite you, entertain you, and leave the experience smiling. Sometimes you just need a score like that, filled with basic pleasures, and Silvestri’s work here succeeds on that mark with aplomb."

A review in Allmusic commented, "Appropriately stoic and expansive, the main theme for Captain America: The First Avenger feels both familiar and iconic, arriving early in the soundtrack (as all good superhero themes must) on a foundation of rolling military snares, sepia-toned brass, and long strings that evoke an endless sea of amber waves of grain. It’s enjoyable and effective, but not groundbreaking, which pretty much sums up the score as a whole. Bombastic, melodramatic, and steeped in late-'70s/early-'80s big-budget adventure cinema, the Captain is well served here, even if it all feels a little old-fashioned at times. That said, it is awfully nice to hear a well-conducted orchestra, as opposed to a room full of expensive computers and keyboards, churn out a big traditional action score, and few do that as well as Silvestri."

References

External links 
 Official website
 Captain America: The First Avenger Soundtrack at Amazon.com

2011 soundtrack albums
2010s film soundtrack albums
Captain America (film series)
Marvel Cinematic Universe: Phase One soundtracks
Buena Vista Records soundtracks
Alan Silvestri soundtracks